Rivergate or River Gate, may refer to:

Places in the United States
 Rivergate, Volusia County, Florida, a named location in Florida
 Rivergate Industrial District, Portland, Oregon; an industrial park in Portland
 Rivergate Mall, Goodlettsville, Tennessee; a shopping mall
 Rivergate Tower, Tampa, Florida; an office building
 Rivergate Convention Center, New Orleans; a convention center
 Rivergate Park, Cleveland, Ohio;  a park in Cleveland
 Rivergate Parkway, Davidson County, Tennessee, United States; an east-west thoroughfare

Other users
 Operation River Gate (2005) a military operation in Iraq, part of Operation Sayeed

See also

 Watergate (architecture), a watercoure security and access doorway found adjacent to rivers
 Gate (water transport), a watercourse transit impoundment water level changing device, found paralleling rivers

 

 
 Rivergate House (novel) by Hillary Waugh
 Rivergate Adventist Elementary, Gladstone, Oregon, USA, see List of Seventh-day Adventist secondary schools
 Gates River, British Columbia, Canada; a river
 Gate (disambiguation)
 River (disambiguation)
 Watergate (disambiguation)